Satyam Shivam Sundaram is a 1978 Indian film.

Satyam Shivam Sundaram may also refer to:
 Sathyam Shivam Sundaram (1987 film)
 Sathyam Sivam Sundaram (2000 film)